Zaječov is a municipality and village in Beroun District in the Central Bohemian Region of the Czech Republic. It has about 1,400 inhabitants.

Administrative parts
Villages of Kvaň and Nová Ves are administrative parts of Zaječov.

Geography
It lies in the Brdy Highlands. The southern part of the municipal territory lies in the Brdy Protected Landscape Area.

History
The first written mention of Zaječov is from 1578. On 1 January 1976, the municipalities of Zaječov and Kvaň were merged.

Sights
The Svatá Dobrotivá Monastery was founded in 1262–1263 as the first Augustinian monastery in the Czech lands. The Gothic building was rebuilt in the Baroque style in the 17th century, the monastery church of the Annunciation was rebuilt in 1713–1719. In 1785, the monastery was abolished and the building converted into a rectory and a school. In 1990, the area was returned to the Augustinians.

Gallery

References

External links

Villages in the Beroun District